Titanix is a dansband, established in 1979 in Valdemarsvik, Sweden. The band appeared at the finals of the Swedish dansband championships in 1997 and 2001, before finishing up at the second place during Dansbandskampen 2009. During their 2009 Dansbandskampen appearance, it was mentioned that the band was not named after the boat  that sank in 1912, but rather an ice hockey stick.

Members
 Maria Rolf (vocals)
 Stefan Rolf (guitar, vocals)
 Jerry Rolf (keyboard, vocals)
 Magnus Löfving (drums, vocals)
 Henry Kieksi (bass, vocals)
 Alyssa Kockauski (drums, synthesizer)

Discography

Albums
 Livs levande - 1996
 Hela världen - 2006
 Drömmar får liv - 2010
 Mitt i ett andetag - 2011
 Genom natten - 2012
 Om då var nu- 2014

Singlar
 Av allt det vackra jag sett 1995 
 Längtan 1997 
 Allt för mig 1999 
 1.2.3 gånger om''' 2001
 Här hos mig 2002
 Flickor är flickor, pojkar är pojkar 2004
 Finally Free 2006 
 Ingen som du 2008
 Try to Catch Me 2009
 Allt jag vill ha 2010

Cassette tapes
 Vol. 1 1988 
 Live på Oléo i Växjö 1991 
 Live i studio 92'' 1992

Svensktoppen songs
 1.2.3 gånger om - 2001
 Här hos mig - 2002

References

External links
 Official website
 Titanix at Myspace

1979 establishments in Sweden
Dansbands
Musical groups established in 1979